Aadil Assana (born 27 January 1993) is a Comorian football player. He primarily plays as a defensive midfielder.

Club career
Assana was a member of the Monaco under-19 team that won the 2010–11 edition of the Coupe Gambardella and made his professional debut on 23 September 2011 in a league match against Laval.

International career
A former youth international for France, Assana made his senior debut for the Comoros national football team in a 2–2 friendly tie with Kenya on 24 March 2018.

References

External links
 
 
 
 
 
 

1993 births
Living people
Citizens of Comoros through descent
Comorian footballers
Comoros international footballers
French footballers
France youth international footballers
French sportspeople of Comorian descent
Association football midfielders
AS Monaco FC players
Clermont Foot players
CA Bastia players
Marignane Gignac Côte Bleue FC players
FC Martigues players
Ligue 2 players
Championnat National players
Championnat National 2 players
Championnat National 3 players